The following is a list of media in Grand Forks, North Dakota, United States:

Print

Daily
Grand Forks Herald

Weekly
The Exponent (located in East Grand Forks, Minnesota)
High Plains Reader (published in Fargo, North Dakota)
Tidbits of Grand Forks (Grand Forks, ND)

Other
Dakota Student (published twice a week by students of the University of North Dakota during the school year and distributed for free)
Red River Valley Women Today (published monthly by the Grand Forks Herald and available for free at area businesses and online)
BBI International (publishes trade magazines and produces events)
Biomass Magazine (published in print and online monthly by BBI International)
Pellet Mill Magazine (published in print and online six times a year by BBI International)
Biodiesel Magazine (published in print and online quarterly by BBI International)
Ethanol Producer Magazine (published in print and online monthly by BBI International)
North American Shale Magazine (published in print and online quarterly by BBI International)
UAS Magazine (published quarterly online by BBI International)
GRAND Lifestyle Magazine (published in print and online quarterly by BBI International)

Television
Grand Forks is included in the Fargo market, which is the 120th largest TV market in the United States (as ranked by Nielsen).  The only television stations that broadcast from studios in Grand Forks is WDAZ.

Radio
Grand Forks is the 289th largest radio market, according to Arbitron.

AM radio

FM radio

See also
List of television stations in North Dakota

External links
The Dakota Student
Grand Forks Herald
WDAZ-TV

References

Grand
Grand Forks, North Dakota
Grand
Grand Forks
Lists of media in Minnesota
North Dakota-related lists